Ryan Murphy may refer to:

Athletes
 Ryan Murphy (American football) (born 1992), strong safety for the New York Giants in the National Football League
 Ryan Murphy (footballer) (born 1985), Australian rules footballer
 Ryan Murphy (ice hockey, born 1979), American ice hockey left wing
 Ryan Murphy (ice hockey, born 1983), American ice hockey right wing
 Ryan Murphy (ice hockey, born 1993), Canadian ice hockey defensemen
 Ryan Murphy (swimmer) (born 1995), American gold medalist in the Summer Olympics and world record holder
 Ryan Murphy (baseball) (born 1999), American baseball player

Others
 Ryan Murphy (filmmaker) (born 1965), U.S. television writer and series creator
 Ryan Murphy (Australian politician) (born 1988)
 Ryan T. Murphy (born 1971), Mormon Tabernacle Choir Associate Director
 Ryan Murphy (Doctors), a character from Doctors

See also

 Ryan Murphey, American musician